In the mythology of Tonga, Ilaheva Vaepopua (Ilaheva, living at Vaepopua) was a mortal woman, the daughter of Seketoa.  Seketo'a was either a chief of Tongatapu, or perhaps a god from Niuatoputapu,
depending on the source. All accounts, however, agree that 'Ilaheva became the wife of Tangaloa and mother of ʻAhoʻeitu, the first divine king of the Tuʻi Tonga dynasty in Tonga, around 900 AD.

References

Further reading
 R.D. Craig, Dictionary of Polynesian Mythology (Greenwood Press: New York, 1989), 82; 
 E.T. Gifford, Tongan Myths and Tales (Honolulu: Bernice P. Bishop Museum Press, 1924), 25–8.

Tongan deities
Legendary Polynesian people
Women in mythology